Ovapınar can refer to:

 Ovapınar, Ardahan
 Ovapınar, Düzce